Smoke Fairies (Katherine Blamire and Jessica Davies) are a British band hailing from Chichester.

History
Blamire and Davies met at school in Sussex during the late 1990s. They spent 2002 in New Orleans, where they absorbed American blues music. When they returned to England they discovered British folk music at the Sidmouth Folk Week Festival while working as car park attendants. They later settled in Vancouver, British Columbia, Canada, for a year before returning to London to start performing.

In 2007, Smoke Fairies toured the UK in support of Bryan Ferry and the following year they released their debut single, "Living with Ghosts", on Music for Heroes. Richard Hawley was an early supporter of the act, saying they were "frankly the best thing I have heard in years". They supported Hawley on his Truelove's Gutter Tour of the UK in October 2009.

In December 2009, Smoke Fairies became the first UK act to release a single on Jack White's label Third Man Records. The double A-side single, "Gastown" / "River Song", was produced by Jack White who also played guitar and drums. Smoke Fairies performed at the 2010 South by South West (SXSW) festival in Texas and supported Laura Marling on a month-long tour of the United States.

They signed to V2 Records/Cooperative Music and released their debut album Through Low Light and Trees in September 2010, latterly self-released in the United States in June 2011 via Year Seven Records. The album was produced by long-term PJ Harvey collaborator Head and recorded at Sawmills Studio in Cornwall, United Kingdom.

To promote the album the band was invited to record a live session for Marc Riley on BBC Radio 6, and was invited back for another session a few months later. The duo also recorded a live session with their band for John Kennedy's  "X-Posure" on XFM.
In November 2010, Smoke Fairies' recording of Neil Young's "Alabama" appeared on a special Mojo album to mark the approaching fortieth anniversary of Young's Harvest LP.

The band embarked on its first headline tour of the UK – a sell-out – in January–February 2011 and performed at several festivals that summer, including Primavera Sound in Barcelona. Before heading to the United States in June 2011 to perform at North by Northeast Festival and their own headline shows, returning again in August 2011 Jessica & Katherine toured the U.S. with Rasputina. Smoke Fairies again returned to the US in October to play support for Blitzen Trapper and Dawes making their second coast-to-coast tour of the year.

Smoke Fairies' follow-up album, Blood Speaks, was released on 21 May 2012, again with a delayed release in the US of 23 April 2013. Again produced by Head Blood Speaks was this time recorded in West London's Eastcote Studio and is inspired by London and by travelling. Pitchfork rated the album 7.2 remarking that Jessica and Katherine "don't trade vocal duties so much as appear to sing from the same body".

Smoke Fairies signed with Full Time Hobby records in 2013 and released their self-titled album "Smoke Fairies" on 14 April 2014. The album spawned singles Eclipse Them All, We've Seen Birds and Shadow Inversions. It was produced by Kristofer Harris at Squarehead Studios in Kent. Well received, The Quietus called the record "brilliantly immersive" and suggested the band were "starting to approach the very English singularity of Her Holiness Kate Bush". On the same theme Mojo magazine chose the album track "Your Own Silent Movie" to feature on their compilation The Dreamers – 15 Tracks of Kate Bush-Inspired Dream Pop".

Later that year the band recorded the Christmas record Wild Winter, which was released only in Rough Trade shops for Christmas 2014. The Christmas after the album saw a full worldwide release and received praise from the New York Times and The Guardian. "Wild Winter" was again produced by Kristofer Harris. The album inspired a beer brewed under the same name by the London brewery Signature Brew.

Jessica and Katherine also contributed vocals to the track "Valentina", a tribute to Valentina Tereshkova—the first woman in space—on The Race For Space, the second album by Public Service Broadcasting. Smoke Fairies toured the UK supporting and performing with Public Service Broadcasting in 2015. It was preceded by the self-released Live in St Pancras Old Church.

In August 2019 Smoke Fairies announced their return with a video for the track "Out of the Woods", produced by Phil Ek. Louder Than War described the track as "dark, stark, skeletal blues". On 25 September 2019, the band announced the album, Darkness Brings the Wonders Home, also produced by Ek, which was released on 31 January 2020. During the promotion for the new record Jessica & Katherine launched their own Podcast 'Smoke Signals' which sees the band discussing the music industry; it's trials, tribulations and hilarities. The podcast's second series was launched a year later, the show ranks highly with Apple Podcasts having a 4.9 out of 5 rating. 

Released on the band's own label 'Year Seven Records' Darkness Brings the Wonders Home charted the band #1 in the UK Indie Breakers Chart, a #1 in the UK Rock & Metal Albums Chart and a Top 10 UK Independent Album. The band performed a live session for Marc Riley on BBC Radio 6 Music 30 January 2020 and John Kennedy on Radio X earlier that week on 28 January 2020. Smoke Fairies toured the UK with the album in January & February 2020 with their current band John J Presley and Sean Fallowfield. 

Single 'Elevator' taken from the album was released on limited edition 7-inch picture-disc during the UK's coronavirus lock-down in April 2020 gaining them more number one chart placings. A #1 in the UK Physical Singles Chart and a #1 in the UK Vinyl Singles Chart. During the pandemic Jessica & Katherine live-streamed three performances via their facebook page raising over £2000 for chosen charities The Red Cross, RSPCA & Emmaus UK. Further in to restrictions in the UK the band recorded and streamed a ticketed live concert for their fans from the De La Warr Pavilion in Bexhill, England.

Discography

Albums
 Strange the Things (Concentrated / Concentrated People, 6 August 2007)
 Through Low Light and Trees (UK: V2 / Cooperative Music, 6 September 2010. U.S.: Year Seven Records, June 2011)
 Blood Speaks (V2 records, 21 May 2012)
 Smoke Fairies (Full Time Hobby, 14 April 2014)
 Live at St Pancras Old Church (October 2015)
 Wild Winter (Full Time Hobby, 12 December 2015)
 Darkness Brings the Wonders Home (Year Seven, 31 January 2020)

CompilationsGhosts: A Compilation of A Sides, B Sides and an EP from the Recent Past (453 Music / Music For Heroes, 2010)Singles and EPs
 "Living with Ghosts" /  "Troubles" – 7-inch (Music for Heroes, August 2008)
 Frozen Heart – 7-inch EP ("Frozen Heart", "Fences", "Morning Light", "We Had Lost Our Minds", "He's Moving On") (Music for Heros, July 2009)
 "Sunshine" / "When you Grow Old" – 7-inch (October 2009)
 "Gastown" / "River Song" – 7-inch limited edition of 150 on tri-colored vinyl; Texas-sized 8" limited edition (Third Man Records, September 2009)
 "Hotel Room" / "Human Concerns" – 7-inch limited edition of 300 (V2 / Cooperative Music) (2010)
 "Strange Moon Rising" / "Requiem" – 7-inch limited edition of 500 (V2 / Cooperative Music, 24 January 2011)
 "Strange Moon Rising" / "Alabama" – 7-inch limited UK tour edition (V2 / Cooperative Music) (24 January 2011)
 "Hotel Room" / "Strange Moon Rising" – 7-inch limited edition of 500 on blue-marbled vinyl (453 Music, 16 April 2011, World Record Store Day)
 "Storm Song" / "Storm Song Demo" – 7-inch limited edition of 500 (V2 / Cooperative Music, 16 May 2011)
"The Three of Us" - EP 9"  (V2 / Cooperative Music) Limited edition 500 & 2 x 7-inch (Year Seven Records, USA) limited edition 1000, Record Store Day 2012
"This Is A Reflection" - EP 12-inch & CD exclusive to Rough Trade Shops (V2 / Cooperative Music) 2012 
"Let Me Know" 7-inch limited edition 300 (V2 / Cooperative Music) 2012
"Upstairs at United, Vol. 6 - EP 12-inch (453 Music) Record Store Day 2013
"Simple Feeling / I Wonder As I Wander" - 7-inch limited edition of 500 (Snowflake Singles Club) 2 Dec 2013
"Eclipse Them All" - digital release (Full Time Hobby) 
"We've Seen Birds" - 7-inch limited edition 500 (Full Time Hobby)  
"Christmas Without A Kiss" - digital release (Full Time Hobby)
"Out of the Woods / Disconnect" - 7-inch limited edition of 300 picture disc (Year Seven - exclusive to Rough Trade Shops)
"Elevator" - 7-inch limited edition of 300 picture disc (Year Seven)

Contributions to anthologies
"Good Man" on Live at the Electroacoustic Club, Vol. 2 (Running Jump Records, 13 November 2006)
"Troubles" on What's Kickin'?, Vol. 2 (Stove Pony, 14 May 2007)
"Troubles" on Shivering Sands and Scavenging Birds (Thames Delta Recording Co., 14 October 2009)
"Alabama" on Harvest Revisited (Promotional CD issued with Mojo Magazine, February 2011)

Guest appearances
 Backing vocals on Richard Hawley's "False Lights from the Land"'' EP (Mute Records, 7 June 2010)
 Backing vocals on Public Service Broadcasting's track Valentina off their "The Race for Space" album (2015)
 Backing vocals on Duke Garwood's "Garden of Ashes" album (Heavenly Recordings, 2017)

References

External links 

 NME Article
Guardian article

British folk rock groups
Musical groups established in 2006